This is a comprehensive list of awards and nominations won by Lupe Fiasco, an American hip-hop artist.

He has thus far in his career, won one Grammy, and has been nominated for eleven others, altogether 12 Grammy nominations. He's also won a USA's Character Approved Award, which had started that year. In total, he has been nominated for thirty-three awards.

AOL Music Award

|-
| 2006 
| Himself 
| Breaker Artist 
| 
|}

BET Hip-Hop Awards

|-
|rowspan="4"| 2006
| Lupe Fiasco's Food & Liquor
| Hip-Hop CD of the Year
| 
|-
|rowspan="2"| "Kick, Push"
| Hip-Hop Video of the Year
| 
|-
| Rookie of the Year
| 
|-
| Himself
| Lyricist of the Year
| 
|-
|rowspan="2"| 2007
| Lupe Fiasco's The Cool
| CD of the Year
| 
|-
| "Superstar"(with Matthew Santos)
| Alltel Wireless People’s Champ
| 
|-
|rowspan="2"| 2008
| Lupe Fiasco's The Cool
| CD of the Year
| 
|-
| "Superstar" (with Matthew Santos)
| Alltel Wireless People's Champ
| 
|-
| rowspan="2"| 2011
| Lasers
| CD of the Year
| 
|-
| "Out of My Head" featuring Trey Songz
| Reese’s Perfect Combo Award
| 
|-
| rowspan="2"| 2012
| "Around My Way (Freedom Ain't Free)"
| rowspan="2"|Impact Track
| 
|-
| "Bitch Bad"
| 
|}

BET Awards

|-
| 2007
| Himself
| Best New Artist
| 
|}

Grammy Awards

|-
|rowspan="3" | 2007
|rowspan="2" | "Kick, Push"
| Best Rap Solo Performance
| 
|-
| Best Rap Song
| 
|- 
| Lupe Fiasco's Food & Liquor
| Best Rap Album
| 
|-
| 2008
| "Daydreamin'" (with Jill Scott)
| Best Urban/Alternative Performance
| 
|-
|rowspan="4" | 2009
| "Paris, Tokyo"
| Best Rap Solo Performance
| 
|-
| Lupe Fiasco's The Cool
| Best Rap Album
| 
|-
|rowspan="2" | "Superstar" (with Matthew Santos)
| Best Rap/Sung Collaboration
| 
|-
|rowspan="2" | Best Rap Song
| 
|-
|rowspan="3" | 2012 
|rowspan="2" | "The Show Goes On"
| 
|-
| Best Rap Performance
| 
|-
| Lasers
|rowspan="2" | Best Rap Album
| 
|-
| 2013
| Food & Liquor II: The Great American Rap Album Pt. 1
| 
|}

MOBO Awards

|-
| 2008
| Himself
| Best Hip-Hop Act
| 
|}

MTV Video Music Awards

|-
| 2008
| "Superstar"
| Best Hip-Hop Video
| 
|-
| 2011
| "The Show Goes On"
| Best Hip-Hop Video
| 
|}

MTV2 Awards

|-
| 2006
| Himself
| Freshest MC Award
| 
|}

NAACP Image Awards

|-
| 2007
| Himself
| Outstanding New Artist
| 
|}

Soul Train Music Awards

|-
| 2007
| "I Gotcha"
| Best New R&B/Soul or Rap New Artist
| 
|}

Teen Choice Awards

|-
|rowspan="2"| 2008
| "Superstar"<small>(with Matthew Santos)
| Best Hip-Hop song
| 
|-
| Himself
| Rap Artist
| 
|-
| 2011
| Himself
| R&B/Hip-Hop Artist
| 
|}

Urban Music Awards

|-
| 2009
| Himself
| Urban Music Award for Best Hip-Hop Act
| 
|}

USA's Character Approved Awards

|-
| 2009
| Himself
| Character Approved Award for Musician
|
|}

References

Chicago-related lists
Lists of awards received by American musician